Mali Otok is a small village northwest of Postojna in the Inner Carniola region of Slovenia.

Church

The local church in the settlement is dedicated to Saint Elizabeth and belongs to the Parish of Postojna.

References

External links

Mali Otok on Geopedia

Populated places in the Municipality of Postojna